Olcea is a commune in Bihor County, Crișana, Romania with a population of 2,773 people. It is composed of four villages: Călacea (Bélkalocsa), Hodișel (Pusztahodos), Olcea and Ucuriș (Ökrös).

References

Olcea
Localities in Crișana